{{DISPLAYTITLE:C7H14N2O2S}}
The molecular formula C7H14N2O2S may refer to:

 Aldicarb, a carbamate insecticide which is the active substance in the pesticide Temik
 Butocarboxim, a carbamate insecticide and structural isomer of aldicarb